Rodrigo Garza Barbero (born 3 December 1979 in Madrid) is a retired field hockey defender/midfielder from Spain. He represented his native country at three consecutive Summer Olympics, starting in 2000.

Club career
After the Athens Games (2004), where the Spain finished in fourth position, Garza moved to The Netherlands, where he joined HC Den Bosch in the Dutch Premier League, called Hoofdklasse. He moved on to national champions HC Bloemendaal in the spring of 2007, and became champion of premier Dutch league in the 2008 and 2009 season, winning also the European Hockey League in his last season with the club.   
Since September 2009 he played for HGC, a Dutch team near The Hague, which is also in the Dutch Premier League.

Born and raised in Madrid, Spain, he started to play Hockey at his hometown school Colegio Valdeluz and then promoted through respective categories until reaching premier Spanish league "División de Honor" playing with San Pablo Valdeluz (later on Ssang Yong Valdeluz). He then moved to play for Club de Campo Villa de Madrid before arriving to the Netherlands.

International career
Garza has been many times junior and senior champion and runner up in both field and indoor Hockey, participating in several Euro championships: Padova, Barcelona, Leipzig and Manchester. He has participated in two Hockey World Cups in Kuala Lumpur and Mönchengladbach. He achieved a major success by winning the first Champions Trophy for Spain in 2004 at the National Hockey Stadium in Lahore, Pakistan and ending runner up in 2008 edition celebrated in Rotterdam, the Netherlands.

References 
 Spanish Olympic Committee

External links

1979 births
Living people
Spanish male field hockey players
Male field hockey defenders
Male field hockey midfielders
Olympic field hockey players of Spain
Field hockey players at the 2000 Summer Olympics
2002 Men's Hockey World Cup players
Field hockey players at the 2004 Summer Olympics
2006 Men's Hockey World Cup players
Field hockey players at the 2008 Summer Olympics
2010 Men's Hockey World Cup players
Olympic silver medalists for Spain
Field hockey players from Madrid
Olympic medalists in field hockey
Medalists at the 2008 Summer Olympics
Club de Campo Villa de Madrid players
HC Den Bosch players
HC Bloemendaal players
HGC players
Spanish expatriate sportspeople in the Netherlands
Expatriate field hockey players